Yellow bristle grass or yellow bristlegrass is a common name for several grass species, including:

 Pennisetum glaucum also known as Setaria glauca and Setaria lutescens
 Setaria parviflora, native to North America
 Setaria pumila